Redenzione can refer to:

 Redenzione (1919 film), an Italian film
 Redenzione (1952 film), an Italian film